Anton Blom (15 August 1924 – 13 January 2012) was a Norwegian journalist and author. He was the first NRK foreign correspondent to Bonn, West Germany from 1967 to 1973. He also was NRK's foreign correspondent to Washington, D.C. from 1981 to 1985.

Bibliography
 Norsk telegraf- og telefonforbund gjennom 25 år: 1930-55. Forbundet, 1955
 Jødenes vei gjennom historien. Cappelen, 1978; new edition: Lunde Forlag, 1998
 Elie Wiesel og ansiktet i vinduet. Cappelen, 1987

References

1924 births
2012 deaths
Norwegian journalists
Norwegian expatriates in Germany
Norwegian expatriates in the United States